Keelathooval is a village in Ramanathapuram district, Tamil Nadu, India. , it had a population of 3900 in 994 households.

Notes

Villages in Ramanathapuram district